Geistingen is a historic village that is now a submunicipality of Kinrooi, in the Limburg province in the Flemish Community of Belgium.

History
In the 1st and 2nd century, a Roman camp was located in Geistingen, and the parish of Geistingen has existed since the 8th century. The village was located on the Roman road connecting Maastricht and Nijmegen At that time, it lay close to the river Meuse. The Meuse in the meanwhile had changed its course to the east. In the 15th century, Ophoven developed next to Geistingen, and the municipality was referred to as Ophoven-Geistingen. In 1450, both villages became part of the county of Horne. In 1614, Horne ceased to be independent and became part of the Prince-Bishopric of Liège. In 1971, the municipality of Ophoven-Geistingen merged into Kinrooi.

Gallery

Notable people
Martin-Hubert Rutten (1841–1927), bishop.

References

External links

Former municipalities of Limburg (Belgium)
Kinrooi
Populated places in Limburg (Belgium)